Erik Balling (29 November 1924 – 19 November 2005) was a Danish TV and film director. He created two of Denmark's most popular TV-series, Matador and Huset på Christianshavn.

His feature film Qivitoq (1956) was nominated for a Golden Palm at the 1957 Cannes Film Festival, and for an Oscar as Best Foreign Language Film. His 1962 film Den kære familie was entered into the 3rd Moscow International Film Festival.

Together with Henning Bahs, he also created the hugely popular series of Olsen Gang feature films.

Biography 
Balling started working for the largest and oldest Danish film production company, Nordisk Films Kompagni, in 1946. He later became the boss of the company.

His made his directing debut with Adam & Eva (1953), which was nominated for a Bodil-award as Best Film.

In 1956 he directed Kispus, which was the first Danish movie filmed in color.

The most popular films directed by Balling were the feature film comedies about a trio of small-time crooks, the Olsen Gang.
There were 13 episodes of this movie series between 1968 and 1981, starting with Olsen-banden. They were remade in several languages.

In 1998, Erik Balling received an Honorary Robert Award.

Filmography

Literature 
 , Balling – Hans liv og film, Informations Forlag, 2011. .
 , Erik Balling : manden med de største succeser i dansk film, Møntergården, 1996. .
 Erik Balling – Som barn var jeg voldsomt hidsig, Aschehoug, 1998. .
 Erik Balling – Gedächtnisbilder: Über ein Leben, die Olsenbande und all die anderen schöne Filme, Mosamax Verlag, Dresden 2016.

References

External links 
 
 
 
 

1924 births
2005 deaths
20th-century screenwriters
Bodil Honorary Award recipients
Danish film directors
Danish television directors
Danish male screenwriters
People from Nyborg